The Cherry Kearton Medal and Award is an honour bestowed by the Royal Geographical Society on "a traveller concerned with the study or practice of natural history, with a preference for those with an interest in nature photography, art or cinematography". It is named for nature photographer Cherry Kearton and was launched in 1967.

Recipients 
Source: Royal Geographic Society

See also 

 List of general science and technology awards 
 List of European art awards
 List of geography awards
 List of photography awards
 List of awards named after people

References 

Visual arts awards
Photography awards
Awards for best cinematography
Awards of Royal Geographical Society
Awards established in 1970